In mathematics, the octonions are a normed division algebra over the real numbers, a kind of hypercomplex number system. The octonions are usually represented by the capital letter O, using boldface  or blackboard bold . Octonions have eight dimensions; twice the number of dimensions of the quaternions, of which they are an extension. They are noncommutative and nonassociative, but satisfy a weaker form of associativity; namely, they are alternative. They are also power associative.

Octonions are not as well known as the quaternions and complex numbers, which are much more widely studied and used. Octonions are related to exceptional structures in mathematics, among them the exceptional Lie groups. Octonions have applications in fields such as string theory, special relativity and quantum logic. Applying the Cayley–Dickson construction to the octonions produces the sedenions.

History 
The octonions were discovered in 1843 by John T. Graves, inspired by his friend William Rowan Hamilton's discovery of quaternions. Graves called his discovery "octaves", and mentioned them in a letter to Hamilton dated 26 December 1843. He first published his result  slightly later than Arthur Cayley's article. The octonions were discovered independently by Cayley and are sometimes referred to as "Cayley numbers" or the "Cayley algebra". Hamilton described the early history of Graves's discovery.

Definition
The octonions can be thought of as octets (or 8-tuples) of real numbers. Every octonion is a real linear combination of the unit octonions:

where  is the scalar or real element; it may be identified with the real number 1. That is, every octonion  can be written in the form

with real coefficients .

Addition and subtraction of octonions is done by adding and subtracting corresponding terms and hence their coefficients, like quaternions. Multiplication is more complex. Multiplication is distributive over addition, so the product of two octonions can be calculated by summing the products of all the terms, again like quaternions. The product of each pair of terms can be given by multiplication of the coefficients and a multiplication table of the unit octonions, like this one (due to Cayley, 1845, and Graves, 1843):

The table can be summarized as follows:

 

The others can be obtained by permuting and changing the signs of the non-scalar basis elements . The 480 different algebras are isomorphic, and there is rarely a need to consider which particular multiplication rule is used.

Each of these 480 definitions is invariant up to signs under some 7-cycle of the points (1234567), and for each 7-cycle there are four definitions, differing by signs and reversal of order. A common choice is to use the definition invariant under the 7-cycle (1234567) with  — by using the triangular multiplication diagram, or Fano plane below that also shows the sorted list of 124 based 7-cycle triads and its associated multiplication matrices in both  and IJKL format. 

A variation of this sometimes used is to label the elements of the basis by the elements , 0, 1, 2, ..., 6, of the projective line over the finite field of order 7. These are the nonzero codewords of the quadratic residue code of length 7 over the Galois field of two elements, . There is a symmetry of order 7 given by adding a constant mod 7 to all subscripts, and also a symmetry of order 3 given by multiplying all subscripts by one of the quadratic residues 1, 2, 4 mod 7.

The multiplication table for a geometric algebra of signature  can be given in terms of the following 7 quaternionic triples (omitting the identity element):

Consider the gamma matrices.

Cayley–Dickson construction

A more systematic way of defining the octonions is via the Cayley–Dickson construction. Just as quaternions can be defined as pairs of complex numbers, the octonions can be defined as pairs of quaternions. Addition is defined pairwise.

where  denotes the conjugate of the quaternion . This definition is equivalent to the one given above when the eight unit octonions are identified with the pairs

Fano plane mnemonic

A convenient mnemonic for remembering the products of unit octonions is given by the diagram, which represents the multiplication table of Cayley and Graves. This diagram with seven points and seven lines (the circle through 1, 2, and 3 is considered a line) is called the Fano plane. The lines are directional. Each pair of distinct points lies on a unique line and each line runs through exactly three points.

Let  be an ordered triple of points lying on a given line with the order specified by the direction of the arrow. Then multiplication is given by

 and 

together with cyclic permutations. These rules together with

1 is the multiplicative identity,
 for each point in the diagram

completely defines the multiplicative structure of the octonions. Each of the seven lines generates a subalgebra of  isomorphic to the quaternions .

Conjugate, norm, and inverse
The conjugate of an octonion

is given by

and the imaginary part by

Conjugation of octonions satisfies the equation

The product of an octonion with its conjugate, is always a nonnegative real number:

Using this the norm of an octonion can be defined, as

Properties
Octonionic multiplication is neither commutative:

 if ,  are distinct and non-zero,

nor associative:

The octonions do satisfy a weaker form of associativity: they are alternative. This means that the subalgebra generated by any two elements is associative.

This equation means that the octonions form a composition algebra. The higher-dimensional algebras defined by the Cayley–Dickson construction (starting with the sedenions) all fail to satisfy this property. They all have zero divisors.

Wider number systems exist which have a multiplicative modulus (for example, 16-dimensional conic sedenions). Their modulus is defined differently from their norm, and they also contain zero divisors.

These four algebras also form the only alternative, finite-dimensional division algebras over the real numbers (up to isomorphism).

Not being associative, the nonzero elements of  do not form a group. They do, however, form a loop, specifically a Moufang loop.

Commutator and cross product

This is antisymmetric and imaginary. If it is considered only as a product on the imaginary subspace  it defines a product on that space, the seven-dimensional cross product, given by

But like the octonion product it is not uniquely defined. Instead there are many different cross products, each one dependent on the choice of octonion product.

Automorphisms

The set of all automorphisms of  forms a group called . The group  is a simply connected, compact, real Lie group of dimension 14. This group is the smallest of the exceptional Lie groups and is isomorphic to the subgroup of  that preserves any chosen particular vector in its 8-dimensional real spinor representation. The group  is in turn a subgroup of the group of isotopies described below.

See also:  – the automorphism group of the Fano plane.

Isotopies
For  this is the same as an automorphism. The isotopy group of an algebra is the group of all isotopies, which contains the group of automorphisms as a subgroup.

Applications
The octonions play a significant role in the classification and construction of other mathematical entities. The set of self-adjoint 3 × 3 octonionic matrices, equipped with a symmetrized matrix product, defines the Albert algebra. In discrete mathematics, the octonions provide an elementary derivation of the Leech lattice, and thus they are closely related to the sporadic simple groups.

Applications of the octonions to physics have largely been conjectural. For example, in the 1970s, attempts were made to understand quarks by way of an octonionic Hilbert space. It is known that the octonions, and the fact that only four normed division algebras can exist, relates to the spacetime dimensions in which supersymmetric quantum field theories can be constructed. Also, attempts have been made to obtain the Standard Model of elementary particle physics from octonionic constructions, for example using the "Dixon algebra" .

Octonions have also arisen in the study of black hole entropy, quantum information science, and string theory.

Octonions have been used in solutions to the hand eye calibration problem in robotics.

Deep octonion networks provide a means of efficient and compact expression in machine learning applications.

Integral octonions
There are several natural ways to choose an integral form of the octonions. The simplest is just to take the octonions whose coordinates are integers. This gives a nonassociative algebra over the integers called the Gravesian octonions. However it is not a maximal order (in the sense of ring theory); there are exactly seven maximal orders containing it. These seven maximal orders are all equivalent under automorphisms. The phrase "integral octonions" usually refers to a fixed choice of one of these seven orders.

Label the eight basis vectors by the points of the projective line over the field with seven elements. First form the "Kirmse integers" : these consist of octonions whose coordinates are integers or half integers, and that are half integers (that is, halves of odd integers) on one of the 16 sets

Then switch infinity and any one other coordinate; this operation creates a bijection of the Kirmse integers onto a different set, which is a maximal order. There are seven ways to do this, giving seven maximal orders, which are all equivalent under cyclic permutations of the seven coordinates 0123456. (Kirmse incorrectly claimed that the Kirmse integers also form a maximal order, so he thought there were eight maximal orders rather than seven, but as  pointed out they are not closed under multiplication; this mistake occurs in several published papers.)

In particular there are 240 elements of minimum nonzero norm 1 in each of these orders, forming a Moufang loop of order 240.

In the integral octonions, all left ideals and right ideals are 2-sided ideals, and the only 2-sided ideals are the principal ideals  where  is a non-negative integer.

The integral octonions have a version of factorization into primes, though it is not straightforward to state because the octonions are not associative so the product of octonions depends on the order in which one does the products. The irreducible integral octonions are exactly those of prime norm, and every integral octonion can be written as a product of irreducible octonions.

The automorphism group of the integral octonions is the group  of order 12,096, which has a simple subgroup of index 2 isomorphic to the unitary group . The isotopy group of the integral octonions is the perfect double cover of the group of rotations of the  lattice.

See also

G2 manifold                  
Octonion algebra
Okubo algebra                 
Spin(7) manifold

Split-octonions
Triality

Notes

References

 
 
 . (Review).

External links
 Koutsoukou-Argyraki, Angeliki. Octonions (Formal proof development in Isabelle/HOL, Archive of Formal Proofs) 

Composition algebras